The Umineko When They Cry visual novel series is produced by the Japanese dōjin soft maker 07th Expansion, and are playable on Microsoft Windows PCs. The games take place on the fictional Japanese island Rokkenjima. The head of a wealthy family named Kinzo Ushiromiya, who lives on and owns Rokkenjima, is near death, and eight of his family members arrive on the island to discuss how Kinzo's assets will be divided once he is dead. Also on the island are three family members who live there, five of Kinzo's servants, and his personal physician at the beginning of the story. After the eight family members arrive, a typhoon traps them on the island and shortly after people start to get mysteriously murdered.

Umineko When They Cry is a series of murder mystery visual novels that requires relatively little player interaction as most of the gameplay is composed of reading text which signifies either dialogue between characters or the inner thoughts of the protagonist who the player assumes. The games use intermissions where the player can obtain several tips which allow the player to read various supplementary information that may or may not be useful in solving the mystery. The series debuted in Japan in August 2007 with Legend of the Golden Witch, the first in the series of eight games, ending with Twilight of the Golden Witch in December 2010. The first four games share the title Umineko no Naku Koro ni, but the fifth through eighth games have the common title Umineko no Naku Koro ni Chiru. An additional fandisc titled Umineko no Naku Koro ni Tsubasa was released in December 2010, and a second fandisc titled Umineko no Naku Koro ni Hane was released in December 2011.

The Umineko no Naku Koro ni Saku collection of prior content and the new episode 9 was released in October 2019. 07th Expansion released a dōjin fighting game titled Ougon Musou Kyoku in December 2010 and an expansion of it titled Ōgon Musōkyoku Cross in December 2011. Alchemist released PlayStation 3 ports of the eight main games, PlayStation Portable ports of the first four games, and an Xbox 360 port of Ougon Musou Kyoku in 2010 and 2011.

Main series

Chiru

Others

Other games

Rondo and Nocturne

Portable

Ōgon Musōkyoku

References

External links
Umineko When They Cry at 07th Expansion 

Umineko When They Cry